Farney may refer to:
Farney, Monaghan - a barony based on a mediaeval Gaelic kingdom, in County Monaghan, Ireland
Dick Farney (1921–1987), Brazilian (jazz) pianist
Marsha Farney (born 1958), American businesswoman and former educator from Georgetown, Texas
A nickname for the Monaghan GAA team, Clones, Ireland
An imaginary voice in the head of Ryan Freel, baseball player